Joseph (Joe) Balsis (born 1921, Minersville, Pennsylvania, died January 2, 1995, Minersville), nicknamed "the Meatman", was an American professional pool player, who was inducted into the Billiard Congress of America's Hall of Fame in 1982.

Career

Early life
Joe grew up playing in the billiard room of his father, John, whose business was in the sale of meat. At an early, Balsis was deemed skilled enough by age 11 to play exhibition matches against professional players including Andrew Ponzi and Erwin Rudolph. When in his teens, he won four consecutive annual junior titles, then left the game and joined the Coast Guard as a boat machinist for several years during pool's temporary decline.  In 1944, he took up competition again, winning the Armed Services Champion title.

Professional career
Balsis rejoined the game in 1964 Balsis, where he began to compete professionally. The following year, he won the World Straight Pool Championship twice and once in 1966. He won the Johnston City All-Around Championship, in 1966. Balsis would then win back-to-back titles at both the 1968 and 1969 Stardust Open All-Around Championship as well as the All Japan Championship in 1969. Between 1966 and 1975 Balsis reached the final of the BCA U.S. Open Straight Pool Championship on five occasions, where he would win twice (1968 & 1974).

Titles
 1965 BRPAA World Straight Pool Championship
 1965 BRPAA World Straight Pool Championship
 1965 National Billiards News Achievement Award
 1966 Johnston City Straight Pool Championship
 1966 Johnston City All-Around Championship
 1966 BRPAA World Straight Pool Championship
 1966 U.S Invitation Pocket Billiard Championship
 1967 Culver City Straight Pool Invitational
 1967 Eastern States Straight Pool Championship
 1968 Stardust Open Straight Pool Championship
 1968 Stardust Open All-Around Championship
 1968 U.S. Masters Straight Pool Championship
 1968 U.S. Open Straight Pool Championship 
 1969 Stardust Open 9-Ball Championship
 1969 Stardust Open All-Around Championship
 1969 All Japan Championship 14.1 
 1969 All Japan Championship All-Around
 1971 Stardust Open Straight Pool Championship
 1974 U.S. Open Straight Pool Championship 
 1982 Billiard Congress of America Hall of Fame

References

American pool players
1921 births
1995 deaths
People from Minersville, Pennsylvania